John Baldwin (April 5, 1772 – March 27, 1850) was a U.S. Representative from Connecticut.

Born in Mansfield in the Connecticut Colony, Baldwin attended the common schools.
He studied law at Brown University, Providence, Rhode Island, and graduated in 1797.
John was admitted to the bar in 1800 and commenced practice in Windham, Connecticut, serving as probate judge of Windham County from 1818 to 1824.

John Baldwin was elected as an Adams to the Nineteenth and Twentieth Congresses (March 4, 1825 – March 3, 1829), and was affiliated with the Whig Party after its formation.
After leaving Congress, John resumed the practice of law in Connecticut.
He died in Windham, Connecticut, March 27, 1850, and was interred in Windham Cemetery.

References

External links

1772 births
1850 deaths
People from Mansfield, Connecticut
Connecticut Whigs
19th-century American politicians
Brown University alumni
People from Windham, Connecticut
National Republican Party members of the United States House of Representatives from Connecticut
Burials at Windham Cemetery